Graciliclava costata is a species of sea snail, a marine gastropod mollusk in the family Horaiclavidae.

It was previously included within the family Turridae.

Description
The length of the shell varies between 5 mm and 10 mm.

(Original description) The small, solid and compact shell has an ovate-elongate shape. Its colour is dull white, the summit buff-yellow, base anterior to the insertion of the lip pale orange-yellow. Along the suture are irregular chocolate splashes. The shell contains 7 whorls including a protoconch of two depressed whorls. Its sculpture consists of eight thick and prominent ribs to a whorl These descend the shell vertically and continuously; on the base they are slightly flexed, and each terminates anteriorly in a bead. Both ribs and interstices are engraved by very minute and dense spiral striae. The snout is traversed by a few coarse spirals, which cease at the bead row. On the smooth glossy protoconch is a pronounced median keel, which ends abruptly at the topmost rib. The aperture is pyriform and produced into a short, wide, open siphonal canal. Behind the lip is a prominent varix which, rising above the suture, fills an intervariceal space on the preceding whorl. A substantial callus sheet spreads on the inner lip, and a tubercle is formed near the right insertion. Just in front of the siphonal canal is a slight insinuation of the outer lip.

Distribution
This marine species occurs off Queensland, Australia and the Philippines

References

 Cotton, B.C. 1947. Australian Recent and Tertiary Turridae. Adelaide : Field Naturalist's Section of the Royal Society of South Australia. Conchology Club Vol. 4 pp. 1–34.
 Wells F.E. (1991) A revision of the Recent Australian species of the turrid genera Clavus, Plagiostropha, and Tylotiella (Mollusca: Gastropoda). Journal of the Malacological Society of Australia 12: 1–33
 Wilson, B. 1994. Australian Marine Shells. Prosobranch Gastropods. Kallaroo, WA : Odyssey Publishing Vol. 2 370 pp.

External links
  Tucker, J.K. 2004 Catalog of recent and fossil turrids (Mollusca: Gastropoda). Zootaxa 682:1–1295.
 
http://www.marine.csiro.au/caabsearch/caab_search.caab_report?spcode=24220035 
http://clade.ansp.org/obis/search.php/55384
http://www.abstract.xlibx.com/a-other/53084-1-turridae-s-mollusca-gastropoda-southern-africa-and-mozambiq.php

costata